Garcinia is a genus of flowering plants in the family Clusiaceae native to Asia, America, Australia, tropical and southern Africa, and Polynesia. The number of species is disputed; Plants of the World Online (POWO) recognise up to 400. Commonly, the plants in this genus are called saptrees, mangosteens (which may also refer specifically to Garcinia mangostana), or garcinias, and is one of several plants known as by the name "monkey fruit".

Many species are threatened by habitat destruction, and at least one species, G. cadelliana, from South Andaman Island, is almost or even completely extinct already.

The fruits are a food source for several animals, such as the archduke butterflies (Lexias spp.) of tropical eastern Asia which relish the sap of overripe mangosteens.

The genus is named after French botanist Laurent Garcin (1683–1751).

Description
Garcinia species are evergreen trees and shrubs, dioecious and in several cases apomictic. The fruit is a berry with fleshy endocarp, which in several species is delicious. Among neotropical Garcinia several species are dioecious (G. leptophylla, G. macrophylla and G. magnifolia), although female trees have often been observed to have some degree of self-fertility.

Uses

The fruit of most species of Garcinia are eaten locally; some species' fruits are highly esteemed in one region, but unknown just a few hundred kilometres away. The best-known species is Garcinia mangostana, which is now cultivated throughout Southeast Asia and other tropical countries, having become established in the late 20th century. Less well-known, but still of international importance, are kandis (G. forbesii) with small round red fruits with subacid taste and melting flesh, the lemon drop mangosteen (G. intermedia) with yellow fruit that look like a wrinkled lemon, and the thin-skinned orange button mangosteen (G. prainiana).

In addition, mangosteen rind (exocarp) extract is used as a spice. It figures prominently in Kodava culture, and G. multiflora is used to flavour and colour the famous bún riêu soup of Vietnam, where this plant is known as hạt điều màu. Garcinia gummi-gutta yields a spice widely used in South Asia, in particular in Kerala, where it is called kodumpulli.

Most species in Garcinia are known for their gum resin, brownish-yellow from xanthonoids such as mangostin, and used as purgative or cathartic, but most frequently – at least in former times – as a pigment. The colour term gamboge refers to this pigment.

Extracts of the exocarp of certain species – typically G. gummi-gutta, but also G. mangostana – are often contained in appetite suppressants, but their effectiveness at normal consumption levels is unproven, while at least one case of severe acidosis caused by long-term consumption of such products has been documented. Furthermore, they may contain significant amounts of hydroxycitric acid, which is somewhat toxic and might even destroy the testicles after prolonged use.

Bitter kola (G. kola) seeds are used in folk medicine. G. mannii is popular as a chew stick in western Africa, freshening the breath and cleaning the teeth.

G. subelliptica, called fukugi in  Japanese, is the floral emblem of Mobuto and Tarama on Okinawa. The Malaysian town of Beruas – often spelled "Bruas" – derives its name from the seashore mangosteen (G. hombroniana), known locally as pokok bruas. It has been used for many years by certain African tribes as a tonic  believed to increase 'energy levels' and to possess digestive and fat-busting properties.

Species

, Kew's Plants of the World Online lists nearly 400 accepted species. Selected species include:

Genetic Diversity 
The genetic diversity of 22 Garcinia accessions was analyzed using peroxidase, RAPD markers, and gene sequence-specific amplification polymorphism (GSSAP). Genetic diversity assessment revealed low genetic variation among them. Phylogenetic analysis indicated that Garcinia species clustered into five groups at a mean similarity coefficient of 0.54. This study showed that the G. magostana accessions can be clearly distinguished by combined peroxidase, RAPD, and gene sequence-specific amplification polymorphism.

References

 
Malpighiales genera
Dioecious plants
Medicinal plants